John Whitney Barlow (June 26, 1838 – February 27, 1914) was a career officer in the United States Army. During and after the American Civil War, he was noted for his engineering talents.

Biography
Barlow was born in Wyoming County, New York. He was appointed to the United States Military Academy from Wisconsin and graduated in May 1861. Barlow was first commissioned into the artillery and served with the famed U.S. Horse Artillery Brigade during the Peninsula Campaign, but transferred to the Topographical Engineers in July 1862. He served with the Battalion of Engineers at Gettysburg and as engineer of an army corps in the siege of Atlanta. He supervised the defenses of Nashville and was brevetted as a  lieutenant colonel for his gallant service there in December 1864.

From 1870 until 1874 he was General Sheridan's Chief Engineer in the Military Division of the Missouri. During this period he made scientific explorations of the headwaters of the Missouri and Yellowstone rivers.   His detailed reports became guides for settlers. Barlow improved the harbors and defenses of Long Island Sound from 1875 to 1883, executed harbor improvements in northern Wisconsin and Michigan, and worked on the construction of a canal around Muscle Shoals on the Tennessee River.

He was the senior American member of the international commission that re-marked the disputed boundary with Mexico in 1892–96. He was subsequently Northwest Division Engineer for four years. On May 2, 1901, he was commissioned as a brigadier general and appointed Chief of Engineers. The next day, May 3, 1901, he retired from the Army after 40 years of service.

Barlow died on February 27, 1914, in Jerusalem, Israel, at the age of 75. His body was shipped back to the United States and was buried at Arlington National Cemetery.

Battery Barlow–Saxton at Fort MacArthur was named in his honor.

Barlow Peak in Yellowstone National Park is named for John W. Barlow.

See also

References

 Marquis Who's Who, Inc. Who Was Who in American History, the Military. Chicago: Marquis Who's Who, 1975.  
 This article contains public domain text from

External links
 

1838 births
1914 deaths
American explorers
Burials at Arlington National Cemetery
Military personnel from New York City
United States Army generals
United States Military Academy alumni
Florence–Muscle Shoals metropolitan area
Union Army officers
People of New York (state) in the American Civil War